We All Want What's Best for Her is a 2013 Spanish drama film directed by  which stars Nora Navas along with Valeria Bertuccelli. It features dialogue in both Catalan and Spanish.

Plot 
Taking place in a "more or less recognizable" gray version of Barcelona, the plot follows a Geni, a brilliant lawyer and a member of the Catalan bourgeoisie who, in the wake of a car crash, finds out that she is interested no longer in her life before the accident.

Cast

Production 
It was shot with dialogue in Catalan and Spanish.

Release 
The film opened the 58th Valladolid International Film Festival (Seminci) on 19 October 2013. It was theatrically released in Spain on 25 October 2013.

Reception 
Jonathan Holland of The Hollywood Reporter assessed that "the central character" (played by Navas in a performance "which can be described as otherworldly") is "more interesting than the film about her in this beautifully-played study of a woman in emotional limbo".

Mirito Torreiro of Fotogramas rated the film 3 out of 5 stars, highlighting the acting duel between Navas and Bertuccelli as the best thing about the film, while noting that it goes sometimes over and over the same things as a negative point.

Accolades 

|-
| align = "center" | 2013 || 58th Valladolid International Film Festival || Best Actress || Nora Navas ||  || 
|-
| rowspan = "11" align = "center" | 2014
| rowspan=2 |  || colspan=2 | Best Drama Film ||  || rowspan = "2" | 
|-
| Best Main Actress || Nora Navas || 
|-
| rowspan = "8" | 6th Gaudí Awards || colspan = "2" | Best Film ||  || rowspan = "8" | 
|-
| Best Director || Mar Coll || 
|-
| Best Screenplay || Mar Coll, Valentina Viso || 
|-
| Best Actress || Nora Navas || 
|-
| rowspan = "2" | Best Supporting Actress || Àgata Roca || 
|-
| Clara Segura || 
|-
| Best Supporting Actor || Pau Durà || 
|-
| Best Makeup and Hairstyles || Laura Bruy, Txus González || 
|-
|  || Best Actress || Nora Navas ||  || 
|}

See also 
 List of Spanish films of 2013

Informational notes

References 

2010s Catalan-language films
2010s Spanish-language films
2010s Spanish films
2013 drama films
Films set in Barcelona